The Popondetta blue-eye (Pseudomugil connieae)  or Popondetta rainbowfish, is a species of fish in the subfamily Pseudomugilinae. It is endemic to Papua New Guinea where it occurs at three localities around Popondetta in the east of the country. This species inhabits clear, fast flowing freshwater streams, although it has been reported from brackish water. Allen gave it the specific name connieae to honour his wife, Connie, who normally prepared Allen's manuscripts for publication. This species is sought-after in the aquarium trade and is available in the European and Australian markets.

References

Popondetta blue-eye
Freshwater fish of Papua New Guinea
Taxa named by Gerald R. Allen
Fish described in 1981
Taxonomy articles created by Polbot